Ned Brooks (August 13, 1901 – April 13, 1969) was an American television and radio journalist who was moderator of NBC's Meet the Press on television from 1953 until 1965, and earlier on radio. Brooks is the second-longest tenured moderator of the program, after Tim Russert.

Born in Kansas City, Missouri, he was raised in Warren, Ohio, and attended public schools there. He was a 1924 graduate of Ohio State University where he became a member of Phi Kappa Tau fraternity. He began his career in newspaper reporting in Ohio at the Ohio State Journal and for Scripps-Howard newspapers for whom he covered Congress from 1932 until 1947.  For five years, he was managing editor of the Youngstown (Ohio) Telegram. He was later a broadcaster for Three-Star Extra, carried on NBC radio (but produced by the ad agency for its sponsor, Sunoco).

References

1901 births
1969 deaths
American television journalists
Ohio State University alumni
NBC News people
American male journalists